Carpendale is a rural locality in the Lockyer Valley Region, Queensland, Australia.

Geography 
Lockyer Creek forms the northern boundary.

History 
Carpendale State School opened on 23 June 1924 and closed on 10 December 1982. It was at 10 Gormans Road.

See also 

 List of schools in West Moreton

References

Further reading 

 —  incorporating Rockmount State School (1899-1964), Mt. Campbell State School (1891-1960) Carpendale State School (1924- )

Lockyer Valley Region
Localities in Queensland